Guo Shuqing (born 23 July 1956), also spelled as Kuo Shu-ching is a Chinese politician, banker, and financial regulator. He is currently serving as the chairman of the China Banking and Insurance Regulatory Commission.

Guo spent most of his career in the finance industry. He formerly served as the Governor and Deputy Party Secretary of Shandong province, chairman of the China Securities Regulatory Commission (CSRC), chairman of China Construction Bank, chairman of the State Administration of Foreign Exchange, vice-governor of the People's Bank of China and vice-governor of Guizhou Province as well as the director of the State Administration of Foreign Exchange.

Early life and education 
Guo Shuqing was born in August 1956 in Chahar Right Back Banner, Inner Mongolia Autonomous Region, near the city of Ulanqab. He is of Han Chinese background. In August 1974, he joined a farming commune in Siziwang Banner, near the regional capital Hohhot, as a labourer during the Down to the Countryside Movement. In 1978, he became part of the first batch of students to return to school after the Cultural Revolution, a period which effectively suspended higher education in China.

He graduated from Nankai University, one of the country's top universities, in 1982 and then pursued a master's degree at the Chinese Academy of Social Sciences.

After graduating he continued to take part in academic research while completing a doctorate in law. During his studies he also worked briefly as a researcher at the State Council office in charge of economic reform; he also took a year-long study abroad trip to St Antony's College at Oxford University.

Career 
Beginning in 1988, Guo became a full-time researcher at the State Council, working in various capacities for institutions related to economic restructuring. In March 1996 he became Secretary-General of the state commission in charge of macroeconomic management. In 1998, he was transferred to Guizhou province as Vice Governor.

In 2001, he became director of the State Administration of Foreign Exchange in addition to Vice Governor of the People's Bank of China, the country's central bank. In 2003 he became chief executive of Central Huijin Investment Ltd., a full state-owned subsidiary of China Investment Corporation. In 2005 he became chairman of the board of the China Construction Bank, one of China's largest banks by revenue. He served in that role for over six years. In 2011, he took on the job of chairman of the China Securities Regulatory Commission (CSRC), China's securities regulator.

In March 2013, Guo was tasked with his second regional stint, this time taking on the office of Governor of Shandong province.  In 2017, Guo was named chairman of the China Banking Regulatory Commission. In March 2018, he was appointed chairman of the newly established China Banking and Insurance Regulatory Commission.

Guo was an alternate member of the 17th CPC Central Committee, and is a full member of the 18th and 19th Central Committees.

References

1956 births
Living people
Nankai University alumni
Political office-holders in Guizhou
People's Republic of China politicians from Inner Mongolia
Chinese Communist Party politicians from Inner Mongolia
Governors of Shandong
China Construction Bank people
Alternate members of the 17th Central Committee of the Chinese Communist Party
Members of the 18th Central Committee of the Chinese Communist Party
Members of the 19th Central Committee of the Chinese Communist Party